"Poor Jenny" is a song released in 1959 by The Everly Brothers. The song spent 12 weeks on the Billboard Hot 100 chart, peaking at No. 22, while reaching No. 14 on the United Kingdom's New Musical Express chart.

Chart performance

Cover versions
A cover version by The Two Joes was released off of Bell Records in 1959, the same year of the Everly Brothers original version. Their version of the song failed to chart and was their only ever release.

Nick Lowe and Dave Edmunds released a version of the song on their 1980 EP, Nick Lowe & Dave Edmunds Sing The Everly Brothers.

References

1959 songs
1959 singles
Songs written by Felice and Boudleaux Bryant
The Everly Brothers songs
Nick Lowe songs
Dave Edmunds songs
Cadence Records singles